Sir Richard Anderson Squires KCMG (January 18, 1880 – March 26, 1940) was the Prime Minister of Newfoundland from 1919 to 1923 and from 1928 to 1932.

As prime minister, Squires attempted to reform Newfoundland's fishing industry, but failed at doing so. He also attempted to diversify Newfoundland's economy. However, his two tenures as prime minister were both marred by serious corruption. He lost the position in 1923 after an arrest for bribery, and in 1932, he narrowly escaped a riot, which forced him from power, and ended democracy in Newfoundland.

While Squires retired after the riot, he continued to campaign against rule by the British Crown under the Commission of Government. He died in 1940, at the age of 60.

Early career
Squires was born in Harbour Grace, Newfoundland in 1880. He started out practising law in St. John's. He served as a member in the government of Edward Patrick Morris from 1913 to 1918. In 1919, Squires started a campaign for the vacant leadership of the Liberal Party. He won the leadership over William Warren.

Prime minister
Squires won the election of 1919 over Sir Michael Cashin of the Newfoundland People's Party (later called the Liberal-Labour-Progressive Party). He did this by forming an alliance with the Fisherman's Protective Union of William Coaker under the name of the Liberal Reform Party.

During his first government, Squires started the development of the Humber River. He also attempted many reforms suggested by Coaker.  These reforms would have regulated the fishery but failed because of a collapse in fish prices which was blamed on Coaker's reforms.

Squires's government attempted to diversify the economy and, to this end, financially assisted the failing transinsular railway operated by the Reid Newfoundland Company, finally nationalizing the railway in 1923.

Fall from power
Squires's government was accused of using bribes to win the 1923 General Election. A cabinet minister Dr. Alex A. Campbell was in the centre of the scandal. Several other cabinet members demanded Campbell be forced to resign. When Squires refused they said they would cross the floor. The Attorney General William Warren issued an arrest warrant for Squires. Squires was arrested and later released on bond. He then resigned as Prime Minister.

Opposition
Squires remained in the House of Assembly, as an independent member. In the next year, Newfoundland saw four governments fall. It was not until Walter Monroe won the 1924 election that stability was restored. Squires remained in the background working on a possible return to power. In 1928 Walter Monroe resigned as Prime Minister and was replaced by his cousin Frederick C. Alderdice. In the election of 1928, Squires returned as Liberal leader and defeated the Conservatives.

Governing in the Depression
His next government started out well, seeing the election of his wife Helena Squires as the first woman to sit in the House of Assembly. However, Newfoundland was struck hard by the Great Depression; fish prices fell and an already severe public debt worsened. In 1932 Canada refused his request to join the Canadian Confederation.

Widespread unemployment caused by the Great Depression and allegations of corruption against Squires and his government along with the government's inability to deal with the economic crisis created widespread discontent and political instability.

In 1932, Squires's finance minister, Peter John Cashin, resigned from the executive council accusing his fellow cabinet ministers of widespread corruption and Squires himself of having falsified council minutes to hide the fact that he had been receiving secret payments out of public funds. Cashin's charge inflamed a public which had already been seized by discontent due to the deteriorating economic situation in the country.

On April 5, 1932, a large parade was organized by the opposition. They marched to the Colonial Building which was the seat of the House of Assembly. There were over 10,000 people at the protest and things got out of control, leading to the 1932 Colonial Building riot. 

The crowd got angry when no one came out to address them. After a short while, several people managed to break into the building. Squires and government members had to escape around the back. Squires was nearly caught trying to get into a cab; he got away only by running through a house on Colonial Street (near the Colonial Building) to a waiting cab on Bannerman Street.

Fall from power
Squires had little choice but to dissolve his government and call an election, the result of which was the defeat of the Liberal government and the loss of Squires's own seat. The Liberals won only two seats out of 28. Alderdice, who was still leader of the opposition, came to power and went about putting into place a Commission of Government, ending democracy in Newfoundland until 1949, when Newfoundland joined Canada.

Squires retired but always remained active in his opposition to the Commission of Government. He died at the age of 60, in 1940.

At the time of his death he was Worshipful Grand Master of the Grand Orange Lodge of British America, one of the few democratic institutions operating during the Commission of Government period.

See also
General elections in Newfoundland (pre-Confederation)

References
 
 Cadigan, Sean T. Newfoundland and Labrador: A History (2009) pp 192–207

External links

Newfoundland in the 1920s

1880 births
1940 deaths
Prime Ministers of the Dominion of Newfoundland
People from Harbour Grace
Knights Commander of the Order of St Michael and St George
Canadian members of the Privy Council of the United Kingdom
Politicians awarded knighthoods